The 2017 European Ladies' Team Championship took place 11–15 July at Montado Golf Resort in Palmela, Portugal. It was the 34th women's golf amateur European Ladies' Team Championship.

Venue 
The hosting course, located in the Lisboa Region and Setúbal District, about 25 kilometres south of Lisbon, Portugal, opened in 1992,   surrounded by vineyards and with an island green on the 18th hole, was designed by Jorge Santana da Silva.

The championship course was set up with par 72.

Format 
All participating teams played two qualification rounds of stroke-play with six players, counted the five best scores for each team.

The eight best teams formed flight A, in knock-out match-play over the next three days. The teams were seeded based on their positions after the stroke-play. The first placed team was drawn to play the quarter final against the eight placed team, the second against the seventh, the third against the sixth and the fourth against the fifth. In each match between two nation teams, two 18-hole foursome games and five 18-hole single games were played. Teams were allowed to switch players during the team matches, selecting other players in to the afternoon single games after the morning foursome games. Teams knocked out after the quarter finals played one foursome game and four single games in each of their remaining matches. Games all square after 18 holes were declared halved, if the team match was already decided.

The eight teams placed 9–16 in the qualification stroke-play formed flight B, to play similar knock-out match-play, with one foursome game and four single games, to decide their final positions.

The three teams placed 17–19 in the qualification stroke-play formed flight C, to meet each other, with one foursome game and four single games, to decide their final positions.

Teams 
19 nation teams contested the event. Each team consisted of six players.

Players in the leading teams

Other participating teams

Winners 
Seven times champions Sweden lead the opening 36-hole qualifying competition, with a score of 20 under par 700, four strokes ahead of team Italy.

Individual leader in the 36-hole stroke-play competition was Linnea Johansson, Sweden, with a score of 9 under par 135, two strokes ahead of four players on tied second place.

Defending champions England won the championship, beating Italy 4–3 in the final and earned their tenth title. Italy's silver was their first medal ever in the history of the championship.

Team Sweden earned third place, beating Spain 4–2 in the bronze match.

Results 
Qualification round

Team standings

Individual leaders

 Note: There was no official award for the lowest individual score.

Flight A

Bracket

Final games

* Note: Game declared halved, since team match already decided.

Flight B

Bracket

Flight C

Team matches

Team standings

Final standings

Sources:

See also 
 Espirito Santo Trophy – biennial world amateur team golf championship for women organized by the International Golf Federation.
 European Amateur Team Championship – European amateur team golf championship for men organised by the European Golf Association.
 European Ladies Amateur Championship – European amateur individual golf championship for women organised by the European Golf Association.

References

External links 
 European Golf Association: Results

European Ladies' Team Championship
European Ladies' Team Championship
European Ladies' Team Championship
European Ladies' Team Championship